The 1928 Southern Conference football season was the college football games played by the member schools of the Southern Conference as part of the 1928 college football season. The season began on September 22.

In the annual Rose Bowl game, Georgia Tech defeated the California Golden Bears by a score of 8–7. The game was notable for a play by California All-American Roy Riegels in which he scooped up a Georgia Tech fumble and ran towards his own goal line. The two-point safety on the ensuing punt proved to be the margin of victory. Georgia Tech thus claims a national championship.

The Florida Gators led the nation in scoring with 336 points, but had their undefeated campaign derailed in the final game by the South's biggest upset that season, a controversial loss to Tennessee.

Tulane back Bill Banker led the conference in individual scoring with 128 points, tying a school record set by Peggy Flournoy in 1925 which was unbroken until 2007 by Matt Forte.

Season overview

Results and team statistics

Key

PPG = Average of points scored per game

PAG = Average of points allowed per game

Regular season

SoCon teams in bold.

Week One

Week Two

Week Three

Week Four

Week Five

Week Six

Week Seven

Week Eight

Week Nine

Week Ten

Week Eleven

Week Twelve

Bowl games

Awards and honors

All-Americans

E - Dale Van Sickel, Florida (AP-1, NEA-1, CO-Utility, UP-HM)
E – Dick Abernathy, Vanderbilt (CP-1, UP-3)
T – Frank Speer, Georgia Tech (AP-1)
T – Jimmy Steele, Florida (NEA-2)
G – Bull Brown, Vanderbilt (UP-2)
G – Bill McRae, Florida (UP-2)
C – Peter Pund, Georgia Tech (CO-1, INS, NEA-1, UP-1, WC-1, CP-2, AP-3, AAB)
HB – Warner Mizell, Georgia Tech (AP-2, CP-2, INS, NANA, NEA-2, UP-2)
HB – Clyde Crabtree, Florida (AP-3, NEA-3, UP-3 [fb])
HB – Bill Banker, Tulane (UP-2)
FB – Gerald Snyder, Maryland  (AP-3)

All-Southern team

The  followers players were picked for the composite first All-Southern team of more than one hundred sports writers and coaches compiled by the Associated Press (AP). The United Press (UP) also selected a team:

References